The men's middleweight event was part of the boxing programme at the 1932 Summer Olympics. The weight class was the third-heaviest contested, and allowed boxers of up to 160 pounds (72.6 kilograms). The competition was held from Tuesday, August 9, 1932 to Saturday, August 13, 1932. Ten boxers from ten nations competed.

Medalists

Results

References

External links
Official Olympic Report
 

Middleweight